Andrei Ianko (born 18 October 1958) is a Romanian wrestler. He competed in the men's freestyle +100 kg at the 1980 Summer Olympics.

References

1958 births
Living people
Romanian male sport wrestlers
Olympic wrestlers of Romania
Wrestlers at the 1980 Summer Olympics
People from Cluj County
World Wrestling Championships medalists